Scooby-Doo! The Mystery Begins is a 2009 American made-for-television comedy horror mystery film directed by Brian Levant. It is a reboot to the films Scooby-Doo and Scooby-Doo 2: Monsters Unleashed. The film reveals how the Mystery Inc. gang met and the events of their first case. The live-action cast features Nick Palatas as Shaggy, Robbie Amell as Fred, Hayley Kiyoko as Velma, and Kate Melton as Daphne. Scooby-Doo was created using computer-generated imagery and his voice is provided by Frank Welker, who was a cast member of the animated series. A sequel, Scooby-Doo! Curse of the Lake Monster, was released in October 2010.

Plot
In Coolsville, Ohio, a pet adoption fair is held. Scooby-Doo is up for adoption, but nobody wants him. Later, on the way back to the pound, Scooby is accidentally left behind. Seeking shelter from a rainstorm, he comes across a graveyard where he witnesses two ghosts rise from their graves. Scooby panics and runs away, ending up in the bedroom of Norville "Shaggy" Rogers, a clumsy and geeky outcast. The two quickly bond and Shaggy adopts Scooby.

Later, Shaggy tries to smuggle Scooby onto the school bus, but a fight between Shaggy, Scooby, and a bully breaks out which causes the bus to crash into a flagpole, which falls on Vice Principal Grimes' car, damaging its windshield. Because of the fight on the bus and the damage to Grimes' car, Shaggy is sent to the library for detention, along with three others: Fred Jones, the quarterback of the football team; Velma Dinkley, a science nerd; and Daphne Blake, a wealthy drama club student. They bond somewhat over a shared interest in mysteries, but quickly get on each other's nerves. The ghosts suddenly appear and chase them to the gym where a pep rally is taking place. A masked figure in a cloak known as the Specter appears, demanding everyone to leave. The stamp-collecting Principal Deedle decides to close the school, but Grimes deems it a prank and suspends the quartet as he refuses to believe that there are ghosts in the school.

The gang try to clear their names by investigating the ghosts at it, but Shaggy and Scooby-Doo end up being locked in the cafeteria freezers. They are freed the next morning by Grimes, who expels them from the school, and threatens to have them arrested for trespassing if they set foot on school property again. Assuming the school librarian and janitor might be trying to close the school after Shaggy remembered overhearing them complaining about it, they use Daphne's knowledge of theatrical costuming to sneak into the school, but they are exonerated when Velma discovers a spell book was recently checked out by Grimes, making them think Grimes is their prime suspect. Searching at night at Grimes' house, they learn that the school grounds were once used by Coolsville Academy, a prep school that was destroyed during a flood the same day they intended to bury a time capsule of the school's history; the gang concludes the ghosts are trying to get their school shut down so they can search for the time capsule unimpeded. The ghosts attack again, and the teens are knocked out. The Specter, keeping Scooby and Grimes as prisoners, forces the gang to search underground for the time capsule. Unable to find the capsule, they trick the Specter into coming down to carry the capsule out of the hole, but the plan backfires when they try to lock him up in a flooded room, and the Specter acquires the capsule.

Stealing the capsule back, the gang uses the spell book to banish the ghosts. Scooby breaks free of his restraints and arrives just in time to subdue the Specter, who is soon revealed to be Deedle. It is then revealed that a stamp misprint was hidden within the time capsule, something that would have been worth a fortune. Determined to obtain the misprint, Deedle used the spell book to summon the ghosts to have the school evacuated so he can accomplish his goal.

After Deedle is arrested for his crimes, the group is re-instated to Coolsville High and publicly congratulated by Grimes, who becomes the new principal. He apologizes to them for wrongly accusing them before announcing the official burial of the time capsule. Just as they begin digging, Shaggy accidentally throws his shovel, which lands on Grimes' car, once again damaging its windshield. Instead of giving him another detention, Grimes forgives Shaggy, stating that accidents happen. The group decide to stay together and solve mysteries, and they head off to "investigate some strange goings-on at the Coolsville museum", a reference to the first episode of Scooby-Doo Where Are You! and their first villain, the Black Knight Ghost.

Cast
 Frank Welker as the voice of Scooby-Doo
 Nick Palatas as Shaggy Rogers
 Robbie Amell as Fred Jones
 Hayley Kiyoko as Velma Dinkley
 Kate Melton as Daphne Blake
 Shawn Macdonald as Principal Deedle / Dark Specter
 Daniel Riordan as the voice of the Dark Specter
 Garry Chalk as Vice Principal Grimes
 Leah James as Prudence Prufrock
 Brian Sutton as Ezekial Gallows
 Al Rodrigo as the voice of Ezekial
 C. Ernst Harth as Otis the Janitor
 Lorena Gale (final role) as the librarian

Production
Filming took place in Vancouver, British Columbia, Canada, including Templeton Secondary School from August 4, 2008.

The music is scored by David Newman, who had previously scored the theatrical films Scooby-Doo (2002) and Scooby-Doo 2: Monsters Unleashed (2004).

Release
Scooby-Doo! The Mystery Begins aired on Cartoon Network on September 13, 2009. Warner Home Video released it on DVD and Blu-ray on September 22, 2009. It has also been released as Scooby-Doo 3 and Scooby-Doo 3: The Mystery Begins.

Reception
Scooby-Doo! The Mystery Begins was the most-watched telecast in Cartoon Network history. It had 6.1 million viewers, outdistancing the previous high of 3.9 million viewers that tuned into the premiere of the animated series Star Wars: The Clone Wars.

Variety called it a "surprisingly effective origin story", and the Los Angeles Times wrote that it is "a first-rate family film and an excellent, faithful take on Scooby-Doo rounded out by a surprising amount of human feeling".

Sequel

Due to the success of Scooby-Doo! The Mystery Begins, a sequel went into development in October 2009. Titled Scooby-Doo! Curse of the Lake Monster, principal photography commenced on March 15, 2010 in various locations around Southern California. The sequel aired on October 16, 2010 and was released on DVD in 2011.

References

External links
 
  
 
 
 Scooby-Doo! The Mystery Begins Official Site

2009 television films
2009 films
2000s adventure comedy films
2000s ghost films
American adventure comedy films
American comedy television films
2000s comedy mystery films
American ghost films
American television films
Films directed by Brian Levant
Films set in Ohio
Films shot in Vancouver
Scooby-Doo live-action films
Television prequel films
Interquel films
Warner Bros. direct-to-video films
Films scored by David Newman
2009 comedy films
2000s English-language films
2000s American films
American prequel films